Geromyia penniseti, the millet grain midge, is a species of gall midge in the family Cecidomyiidae. It is found in Africa and South Asia. During the rainy season, it feeds on the developing grains of pearl millet plants.

References

Further reading

 
 

Cecidomyiinae
Insects described in 1920
Insect pests of millets

Taxa named by Ephraim Porter Felt